The North Herts Premier Pool League is a UK Eight ball pool league covering Hertfordshire in the southeast of England.

It is predominantly played at venues in the Hertfordshire towns of Stevenage, Hitchin, Letchworth, Ickleford and surrounding villages. The high-profile competition is home to current national and world ranked players such as Danny Miller, Michael Yates, Perry Gillett, Andy Barker, Michael Kent and Gareth Steele. Gareth Steele is certified by Guinness for holding a number of world pool records including the longest ever match in the history of pool.

The main rivalries include the clash of major pool forces from the three main towns: Stevenage, Hitchin and Letchworth. Tom Tiddlers is a team of Stevenage's elite players; Broadmead represents Hitchin; and the Pelican from Letchworth hails from their host The Baldock Pool League.

The league gained notoriety with several celebrities playing including Ed Westwick (Gossip Girl, J Edgar, Children of Men), Stephen Dorff (Blade, Space Truckers) and Milo Ventimiglia (Rocky Balbo) in preparation for his part in the Celebrity Pool TV series.

The league is sanctioned by the EPA, UK8Ball and Inview Sports Events.

Honours 

Champions include

NHPPL 2008 Summer Team Champions Broadmead
NHPPL 2008 Summer Knockout Plate Champions Tom Tiddlers
NHPPL 2008 Singles Champion Dave Berry
NHPPL 2008/9 Winter Team Champions Tom Tiddlers
NHPPL 2008/9 Cup Winners Tom Tiddlers
NHPPL 2008/9 Handicap Cup Winners T2
NHPPL 2008/9 Winter Singles Champion Michael Yates
NHHPL 2009 Summer Team Champions Broadmead
NHPPL 2009 Summer Knockout Plate Champions The Sailor
NHPPL 2009/10 Winter Team Champions Tom Tiddlers
NHPPL 2009/10 Cup Winners Broadmead
NHPPL 2009/10 Singles champion Rob Stevens
NHPPL 2010/11 Winter Team champions Broadmead
NHPPL 2010/11 Cup Winners Broadmead
NHPPL 2010/11 Handicap Cup Winners Saint Nicholas
NHPPL 2010/11 Singles Champion David Berry
NHPPL 2011 Summer Team Champions BDPL Allstars
NHPPL 2011 Summer Knockout Plate Champions CIU

Doubles Champions
2009/10 lee Falanga & Michael Yates
2010/11 John Berry & David Berry

Captains Cup
2009/10 Lee Falanga
2010/11 Andrew Fisher

References 

Pool leagues